Dino Boffo (born 19 August 1952) is an Italian journalist. From 1994 to 2009, he was editor of the newspaper Avvenire, and from, 2010 to 2014 director of the television network TV2000 .

References

1952 births
Living people
Italian newspaper editors
Italian television journalists
20th-century Italian journalists
21st-century Italian journalists
Italian male journalists
People from the Province of Treviso
20th-century Italian male writers